The 2000 PGA Championship was the 82nd PGA Championship, held August 17–20 at the Valhalla Golf Club in Louisville, Kentucky. It was the second time for the event at Valhalla, which hosted four years earlier in 1996. Tiger Woods won his second straight PGA Championship and fifth major in a three-hole playoff over Bob May. Woods and May finished at 18 under par to set the PGA Championship record to par, later equaled by Woods in 2006. It was the first time since 1937 that a PGA Championship title was successfully defended, and the first ever as a stroke play event. Woods and May were five shots ahead of third-place finisher Thomas Bjørn.

Woods' victory marked the first time since 1953 (Ben Hogan) that a player had won three major championships in the same calendar year; Woods won the U.S. Open and the British Open in the previous two months for three consecutive majors. He went on to win the Masters in April 2001 to complete the Tiger Slam of four consecutive majors.

May opened with an even-par 72 then shot 66 (−6) in each of the final three rounds; this was the only time he was in contention in a major championship. Designer of the course and five-time champion Jack Nicklaus, age 60, made his final appearance at the PGA Championship. Playing with Woods, he needed an eagle on the 36th hole to make the cut; his pitch shot missed by inches and he settled for birdie.

Valhalla later hosted the Ryder Cup in 2008, the first U.S. victory in nine years. The Senior PGA Championship was played at the course in 2004 and 2011 and the PGA Championship returned in 2014.

Course layout

Source:

Length of the course for previous majors:
 , par 72 - 1996 PGA Championship

Round summaries

First round
Thursday, August 17, 2000

Second round
Friday, August 18, 2000

Third round
Saturday, August 19, 2000

Final round
Sunday, August 20, 2000

In the final pairing and well ahead of the field at the turn, May and Woods both shot 31 (−5) on the back nine. A key hole was the par four 15th. Holding a one-shot lead, May hit his approach shot to within  while Woods missed the green. When May missed the short birdie putt, his lead remained a single stroke. After Woods' birdie on 17, they were tied going to the final hole, a par five. On the green, May curled in a double-breaking 15-footer (4.5 m) for birdie; Woods then sank a pressure-packed five-footer (1.5 m) for his own birdie to tie and force a three-hole playoff. In the penultimate pairing, Scott Dunlap bogeyed the first two holes and carded a 75 for 279;  had 76 for 281 and tied for nineteenth.

Source:

Scorecard
Final round

Cumulative tournament scores, relative to par

Source:

Playoff
Woods birdied the first playoff hole and parred the next two to win the three-hole playoff by one stroke.

Scorecard
Playoff

Cumulative playoff scores, relative to par
Source:

References

External links
PGA.com – 2000 PGA Championship

PGA Championship
Golf in Kentucky
Sports competitions in Louisville, Kentucky
PGA Championship
PGA Championship
PGA Championship
PGA Championship